The Madīd ("protracted") metre is one of the metres used in classical Arabic poetry. The theoretical pattern of the metre is as follows, where u = a short syllable, – a long syllable, and x = anceps (either long or short):

 
| x u – x | x u – | x u – – | x u – |

However, more usually the metre is found in a trimeter version. The full version of the trimeter is as follows:

 
| x u – x | x u – | x u – – |

In two of the examples below, the metre is used in a catalectic trimeter version (i.e. shortened by one syllable), as follows:

 
| x u – x | x u – | x u – |

In the above catalectic trimeter version, the 2nd and 3rd anceps syllables (x) are usually long (never both short), and the 3rd is almost always short. The final foot | u u – | may become | – – |.

The Madīd metre is only rarely used. Only 0.43% of Vadet's corpus of 1st–3rd century AD poetry are in this metre. It does not occur at all in Stoetzer's corpus of 8th-century poems or in the 10th-century poet al-Mutanabbi. The tetrameter version is rarely found in practice except in prosodists' examples.

Examples

Tetrameter
The longer tetrameter version of this metre is rare. The following line, a mother's lament for her son, is found in the Ḥamāsa, an anthology of poems compiled in the 9th century by Abū Tammām:

| – u – – | – u – || – u – – | u u – |

"Would that my heart for an hour * could control its grief for you;
Would that my soul could be sacrificed * to Fate instead of you."

In this version, there is a clear break between the two halves of the hemistich.

Trimeter
The trimeter is more common than the tetrameter. The following line is by the 8th-century Iraqi poet Abu-l-ʿAtahiya:

| – u – – | u u – | – u – – |
| – u – – | – u – | u u – – |

"Lo, you are dwelling in Fate's vale;
when Death strikes you, it will not fail."

Trimeter catalectic
More often the trimeter is used in a catalectic version, that is, with the final syllable missing. A well known poem in this catalectic version is the following by the Baghdadi Sufi poet Sumnūn al-Muḥibb (also known as Samnūn, died c. 910 AD):

– u – – | – u – | u u –
– u – – | – u – | u u –
– u – – | u u – | u u –
– u – – | – u – | u u –
– u – – | – u – | u u –
– u – – | – u – | u u –

"I had a heart which I lived with;
I lost it in its turning.
Lord, return it to me, since
my breast has become narrow in searching for it.
And succour me as long as life remains,
O succour of him who seeks assistance."

Another version of the metre is used by the Arabian poet Baha' al-din Zuhair (1186–1258) in the love ode which begins:

– u – – | – u – | – –
u u – – | – u – | – –
– u – – | – u – | u u –
– u – – | – u – | – –

"Everything from you is acceptable
and bearable in my eyes;
And what pleases you of my destruction
is easy for me and (readily) bestowed."

In this version of the metre, the final u u – is optionally changed to – –. This variation, affecting the last three syllables of the line, is also found in the Basīṭ metre, and is also common in Persian poetry.

Medieval Hebrew poetry
This metre is almost never used in medieval Hebrew poetry. However, Halper quotes a piyyut written by the 12th-century Spanish scholar Abraham ibn Ezra in the trimeter version of the metre, which runs as follows:

| – u – – | – u – | – u – – |

Because of the rarity of short syllables in Hebrew, Ibn Izra chooses the long alternative of each anceps.

See also

 Metre (poetry)#The Arabic metres
 Arabic prosody

References

External links
A recitation of Sumnūn's kāna lī qalbun.
A traditional lesson on the Madid metre by Muhammad Hasan Uthman (in Arabic)

Arabic poetry
Poetic rhythm
Arabic poetry forms
Arabic and Central Asian poetics
Hebrew-language literature